The Roman Catholic Diocese of Dunkeld is one of eight dioceses of the Latin Church of the Catholic Church in Scotland. On 28 December 2022, the Diocese became sede vacante following the resignation of Bishop Stephen Robson due to ill health.

History
It is thought that the diocese was constituted as far back as the middle of the ninth century. The first occupant was styled Bishop of Fortriu, the name by which the kingdom of the northern Picts was then known. This bishop was also styled Abbot of Dunkeld, perhaps holding jurisdiction, formerly enjoyed by Iona, over the other Columban monasteries in Scotland.

In 1127 King Alexander, who had already founded the Diocese of Moray farther north, erected Dunkeld into a cathedral church and replaced the Columban monks by a chapter of secular canons. The new bishopric appears to have included a great part of what afterwards became the Diocese of Argyll, and retained its jurisdiction over various churches representing old Columban foundations. There were thirty-five bishops of Dunkeld from its foundation until the suppression of the Catholic hierarchy during the Protestant Reformation in the sixteenth century.

The Catholic Church restored the diocese on 4 March 1878, by decree of Pope Leo XIII.  The cathedral chapter, erected in 1895, consisted of a provost and eight canons.

Present day
Dunkeld is a suffragan see of the Archdioceese of St Andrews and Edinburgh, and includes the counties of Perth, Angus, Clackmannan, Kinross, and the northern part of Fife. In 2020 the diocese comprised 45 parishes of 43,000 Catholics from a total population of 400,000 (10.8%) served by 35 priests and 4 deacons. The diocesan cathedral is dedicated to Saint Andrew and is located in Dundee rather than Dunkeld, Dundee being the residence of the majority of the Catholics of the diocese and the largest centre of population.

Parishes 
City of Dundee

 St Andrew's Cathedral, Nethergate, Dundee
 St Clements, Charleston
 St Columba's, Kirkton,
 Immaculate Conception, Lochee
 St Joseph's, Wilkie's Lane, Dundee
 Ss Leonard & Fergus, Ardler
 Our Lady of Victories, Hilltown,  Forebank
 Our Lady of Good Counsel, Broughty Ferry
 Our Lady of Sorrows, Fintry
 St Ninian's, Menziehill
 St Patrick's, Stobswell, Dundee
 Ss Peter & Paul's, Coldside, Dundee
 St Piux X, Douglas, Dundee

Angus

 St Thomas of Canterbury, Arbroath
 St Ninian's, Brechin
 St Anne's, Carnoustie
 St Fergus’, Forfar
 St Anthony's, Kirriemuir
 St Bride's, Monifieth
 St Margaret's, Montrose

Clackmannanshire
 St Mungo's, Alloa
 St John Vianney's, Alva
 St Bernadette's, Tullibody

Fife
 St Thomas's, Auchtermuchty
 St Columba's, Cupar
 St Serf's, High Valleyfield
 St Fillan's, Newport-on-Tay
 Our Lady Star of the Sea, Tayport

Kinross-shire

St James’, Kinross

Perthshire and Stirlingshire

 Our Lady of Mercy, Aberfeldy
 St Luan's, Alyth
 Our Lady of Perpertual Succour, Auchterarder
 St Stephen's, Blairgowrie
 St Joseph the Worker, Callander
 St Margaret's, Comrie
 St Fillan's, Crieff
 St Mary's, Coupar Angus
 Ss Fillan's & Alphonsus, Doune, Stirling.
 The Holy Family, Dunblane, Stirling.
 St Columba's, Birnam
 Our Lady of Lourdes’, City of Perth
 St John the Baptist's, City of Perth
 St Mary's Monastery, Kinnoull
 St Mary Magdalene's, City of Perth
 St Bride's, Pitlochry

Education
Due to the number of immigrants from Ireland during the 19th century, the see city of Dundee has always had a higher percentage of Catholics (between 18%-20%) than other cities and towns on the East Coast. As a result, since that time, there have been a good number of primary and secondary schools in the diocese. As of 2010, the Diocese website listed 21 primary schools and 4 secondary schools: two in Dundee (St. John's and St. Paul's), St John's Academy in Perth and Kilgraston School (an independent school) in Bridge of Earn some few miles south-east of Perth.

Religious communities
There are 5 institutes of religious life for men: the Redemptorists who run a retreat centre at Kinnoull in Perth; the Pallotines at St. Joseph's, who serve the Polish community in Dundee; the CST Fathers (Congregation of Saint Thérèse of Lisieux) (an Oriental rite foundation from India) in the parish of St. Clement of Rome; the SMA Fathers (Society of African Missions) in Dunblane and the Marist Brothers who teach. Within the diocese there are 7 institutes of religious life for women: the Columban Sisters, the Little Sisters of the Poor (left 2015), the Religious Sisters of Charity, the Servite Sisters, the Sisters of Mercy, the Society of the Sacred Heart and the Ursulines. These women are involved in a variety of ministries: teaching, administration, parish work and running a home for the elderly.

The Diocese also operates its own facility for elderly people: St. Mary's Home in Monifieth as well as a day care centre attached to the home.

In August 2015 the Little Sisters of the Poor, who had been resident at St. Joseph's, Wellburn for more than 150 years, announced that they could no longer continue to run their care home due to diminishing numbers of Sisters. The Diocese purchased the care home from the Sisters so that the care of the elderly mission at the home may continue. In 2015 a Care Home Manager was appointed to operate the facility on behalf of the Diocese, but given the age and condition of the premises, the home was closed in 2017.

Bishops

Past and present ordinaries

(Modern Bishops are included in the above-mentioned main article, but are not the only part of post-Reformation bishops.)
The following is a list of the modern Bishops of Dunkeld:

 George Rigg (appointed 22 March 1878 – died 18 January 1887)
 James August Smith (appointed 14 August 1890 – translated to the Archdiocese of St Andrews and Edinburgh on 30 August 1900)
 Angus MacFarlane (appointed 21 February 1901 – died 24 September 1912)
 Robert Fraser (appointed 14 May 1913 – died 28 March 1914)
 John Toner (appointed 8 September 1914 – died 31 May 1949)
 James Donald Scanlan (succeeded 31 May 1949 – translated to the Diocese of Motherwell on 23 May 1955)
 William Andrew Hart (appointed 27 May 1955 – retired 26 January 1981)
 Vincent Paul Logan (appointed 26 January 1981 – resigned 30 June 2012)
 (Basil O'Sullivan apostolic administrator (appointed 6 July 2012 – resigned 11 December 2013))
 Stephen Robson (appointed 11 December 2013 - resigned 28 December 2022)

Coadjutor Bishops
James Maguire (1939-1944)
James Donald Scanlan (1946-1949)

Other priests of this diocese who became bishops
Michael Foylan, appointed Bishop of Aberdeen in 1964
Joseph Michael McGee, appointed Bishop of Galloway in  1952

See also
 Catholic Church in Scotland
 St Mary, Our Lady of Victories Church, Dundee

References

External links

Diocese of Dunkeld
Scottish Conference of Catholic Bishops
St. John's High School
Kilgraston School for Girls

Christianity in Dundee
Christianity in Perth and Kinross
Dunkeld
Dunkeld
Dunkeld
Christianity in Angus, Scotland
Roman Catholic Ecclesiastical Province of St Andrews and Edinburgh